Hir (also Romanized as Hīr) is a village in Hudian Rural District, in the Central District of Dalgan County, Sistan and Baluchestan Province, Iran. At the 2006 census, its population was 99, in 19 families.

References 

Populated places in Dalgan County